The 1988 MAAC men's basketball tournament was held March 2–7 at a combination of on-campus gymnasiums and the Meadowlands Arena in East Rutherford, New Jersey. This was the first edition of the tournament.

Top-seeded La Salle defeated  in the championship game, 79–70, to win their first MAAC men's basketball tournament.

The Explorers received an automatic bid to the 1988 NCAA tournament as the #13 seed in the Midwest region.

Format
All eight of the conference's members participated in the tournament field. They were seeded based on regular season conference records.

First Round games were played at the home court of the higher-seeded team. All remaining games were played at a neutral site at the Meadowlands Arena in East Rutherford, New Jersey.

Bracket

References

MAAC men's basketball tournament
1987–88 Metro Atlantic Athletic Conference men's basketball season
MAAC men's basketball tournament
MAAC men's basketball tournament